Lessard River may refer to:

 Lessard River (Chaudière River tributary), Chaudière-Appalaches, Quebec, Canada
 Lessard River (rivière Franquelin Branche Ouest),  Côte-Nord, Quebec, Canada

See also
 Lessard (disambiguation)